Nykiel is a surname. Notable people with the surname include:

Julie Nykiel (born 1958), Australian women's basketball player
Krzysztof Nykiel (born 1982), Polish professional footballer 
Krzysztof Józef Nykiel (born 1965), Polish Roman Catholic priest and the regent of the Apostolic Penitentiary
Natalia Nykiel (born 1995), Polish singer and songwriter

See also
Nykiel, is a village in the administrative district of Gmina Wierzbinek, within Konin County, Greater Poland Voivodeship, in west-central Poland

References